Saperda punctata is a beetle species of flat-faced longhorns belonging to the family Cerambycidae, subfamily Lamiinae.

Distribution
This beetle is widespread in most of Europe (Albania, Austria, Bosnia, Bulgaria, Croatia, Czech Republic, France, Germany, Greece, Hungary, Italy, Lithuania, Macedonia, Moldova, Montenegro, Poland, Romania, Russia, Serbia, Slovakia, Slovenia, Spain, Switzerland, Turkey, Ukraine) and in the Near East. In Central Europe is a protected species, as in a vulnerable position owing to dying out of old elm trees Ulmus species), suffering from an elm disease (Tracheomycosis).

Description

The head, pronotum and elytra are greenish, with four black spots on pronotum and six black spots on each elytron.

This species is rather similar to Saperda octopunctata.

Biology
It is a nocturnal species. The adults can be encountered from May through August, completing their life cycle in one to two years. Larvae are wintering.

Larvae mainly feed under bark in dead trunks or large branches of elm (Ulmus species), but also of other deciduous trees such as oak and willow (Quercus and Salix species).

References

External links
  Cerambycoidea
  Cerambyx

punctata
Beetles of Europe
Beetles described in 1767
Taxa named by Carl Linnaeus